Reservoir is a neighborhood in southwest Providence, Rhode Island. It is bounded to the north and east by the Amtrak Northeast Corridor railroad tracks, and to the west and south by the municipal boundary with Cranston. The population of the neighborhood, as of 2000, was 2,963.

Mashapaug Pond lies entirely within the Reservoir neighborhood. The Gorham Manufacturing Company made its home on the pond in the area.

The neighborhood is 40.5% Non-Hispanic White, 15.4% Asian or Pacific Islander, 16.6% African-American, and 22.6% Hispanic. The median household income is $39,769, and the median family income is $41,202. 10.4% of families live below the poverty line.

Government
At the municipal level, all of Reservoir is within Ward 8.  James Taylor, a Democrat, represents Ward 8 in the Providence City Council.  He was first elected in 2017.

References

Neighborhoods in Providence, Rhode Island